David Gareginovich Arutinian (born May 31, 1984) is a Georgian chess grandmaster since 2006, and an international master since 2002. He is ranked 9th in Georgia and 453rd in the world. His highest rating was 2593 (in April 2008).

Arutinian's main results are: 
 Strasbourg Prestige open — 1st place
 Aeroflot open A2 — 1st place.
 In 2007, tied for first place with Wang Yue, Vugar Gashimov, Vasily Yemelin and Yuri Drozdovskij in the Cappelle-la-Grande Open.
 In 2008 he tied for 1st–8th with Vugar Gashimov, Sergey Fedorchuk, Yuriy Kryvoruchko, Konstantin Chernyshov, Andrei Deviatkin, Vasilios Kotronias and Erwin L'Ami in the Cappelle-la-Grande Open.
 2009: 2nd place in 16th Vienna Open
 2010: he tied for 1st–8th with Sergey Volkov, Viorel Iordăchescu, Eduardo Iturrizaga, Gadir Guseinov, Hrant Melkumyan, Aleksej Aleksandrov and Tornike Sanikidze in the 12th Dubai Open.
 2011: Sydney International Open — tied for 2nd–8th place, 2nd place using Buchholz
 In 2012, Warsaw chess festival group A — 2nd place.
 2012: 1st place in rapid chess event at the 11th Open International de Rochefort
 In 2012, 11th Rochefort Open tournament — tied 1st place with Bassem Amin.
 He won the Karen Asrian Memorial in 2012.

Arutinian is the Georgian runner-up in 2006 and 2007.
He represented Georgia in 2 Olympics: 2006 and 2008.

In 2007, he was also a participant in the European Team Championships.

Arutinian is a FIDE Senior Trainer (2016). He coaches the men and women Georgian Olympic team.

Some of his successful students are:
Sopiko Guramishvili — World champion under 16, 2006
Keti Tsatsalashvili — World champion under 16, 2007
Bobby Cheng — World champion under 12, 2009
Anna Maja Kazarian — European Silver medal under 12, 2012
Sayin Zhanat — World School Champion under 16, 2015
Zhansaya Abdumalik — Silver medal in World chess championship under 12, Silver medal in World Junior chess championship under 20

Georgian Women Olympic team: 2nd place in European team chess championship in 2009, 3rd place in World chess Olympiad in 2010

References 

Chess players from Georgia (country)
Chess grandmasters
1984 births
Living people